Jamie Ison (born September 7, 1953) is an American realtor and politician who served in the Alabama House of Representatives from the 101st district from 2002 to 2014.

References

1953 births
Living people
Republican Party members of the Alabama House of Representatives